Alaa Kadhim (born 1 July 1970) is an Iraqi football striker who played for both the Iraq and Talaba SC, where he was also the club president.

Alaa was one of the best Iraqi strikers during the 90s during Iraq’s 1994 World Cup qualifying campaign. During the games, Alaa scored 7 goals, including the winner in the 2-1 win over Iran. 

The forward started his career with Al-Sinaa before moving to Talaba in 1990. After his exploits for the national team during the qualifiers in Doha, he was offered a contract by Qatari club Al-Taawon (now Al-Khor) to play for them. 

He made a few appearances for Iraq during the disastrous 1998 World Cup qualifiers losing both games to Kazakhstan, after helping Iraq win the 1997 Nehru Cup in India. Alaa was recalled to the national team by Najih Humoud and captained the team to the 1999 International Friendly Tournament, his last games for Iraq.

Career statistics

International goals
Scores and results list Iraq's goal tally first.

References

1970 births
Al-Talaba SC players
Iraqi footballers
Living people
Al-Shorta SC players
Association football forwards
Iraq international footballers